Twelve Shots on the Rocks is the sixth studio album by the Finnish rock band Hanoi Rocks, released in 2002, however it was their first studio album since the band's break-up in 1985. Critical and commercial acclaim for the album exceeded expectations and the album went Gold in their native Finland. The CD was issued twice. The first issue in Finland had 13 tracks and a different mix to the North American release which had 17 tracks.

Track listing Finnish pressing 
"Intro" – 0:28
"Obscured" (Juan Amaral, Hector Fernandez, Gaby Zero, Michael Monroe, Jude Wilder) – 4:06
"Whatcha Want" (Monroe, Wilder) – 4:17
"People Like Me" (Andy McCoy, Monroe) – 2:58
"In My Darkest Moment" (McCoy, Monroe) – 4:23
"Delirious" (Gary Holton, Monroe, Ronnie Thomas, Wilder, Williams) – 3:15
"A Day Late, a Dollar Short" (McCoy) – 3:08
"New York City" (Monroe, Wilder) – 4:04
"Winged Bull" (Daryl Hall) – 4:27
"Watch This" (Monroe, Wilder) – 3:46
"Gypsy Boots" (McCoy, Monroe) – 4:12
"Lucky" (McCoy, Monroe) – 3:22
"Designs on You" (Monroe, Wilder) – 10:30

Track listing North American pressing 
"Intro" – 0:28
"Obscured" (Amaral, Fernandez, Gutierres, Monroe, Wilder) – 4:06
"Bad News" (Martin) – 3:48
"New York City" (Monroe, Wilder) – 4:04
"Delirious" (Holton, Monroe, Thomas, Wilder, Williams) – 3:15
"A Day Late, a Dollar Short" (McCoy) – 3:08
"In My Darkest Moment" (McCoy, Monroe) – 4:23
"People Like Me" (McCoy, Monroe) – 2:58
"Whatcha Want" (Monroe, Wilder) – 4:17
"Moonlite Dance" (Monroe, McCoy) – 2:55
"Gypsy Boots" (McCoy, Monroe) – 4:12
"Lucky" (McCoy, Monroe) – 3:22
"Watch This" (Monroe, Wilder) – 3:46
"Designs on You" (Monroe, Wilder) – 10:30
"L.A.C.U." – (Lacu) – 0:18
"Are You Lonely Tonight?" (DeVille) – 3:09
"Winged Bull (Hall) – 4:28

Personnel 
Hanoi Rocks
Michael Monroe – lead vocals, saxophone, harmonica, guitars, keyboards, percussion
Andy McCoy – guitars, backing vocals
Costello Hautamäki – guitars, backing vocals
Timpa – bass, backing vocals
Lacu – drums, percussion

Chart positions

Album

Singles

References 

Hanoi Rocks albums
2003 albums